The 313th Airlift Squadron is a United States Air Force Reserve squadron, assigned to the 446th Operations Group, stationed at McChord Field, Joint Base Lewis–McChord, Washington. It is an associate unit of the active duty 7th Airlift Squadron, 62d Airlift Wing.

Overview 
The mission of the 313th consists of airlift and aerial delivery on a worldwide basis, flying the Boeing C-17 Globemaster III jet transport. The majority of the airlift mission is conducted in the Pacific and Alaska; however, missions are also flown to Europe, Africa, and South America.

History

Patch history 
Patch created by Larry Kangas in 1983. On a light blue disc in front of a black mountain with a white snow cap, a blue demi-globe outlined and grid lined yellow issuant from base overall a horizontal arced flight symbol above a white parachute supporting a white triangle within a narrow yellow border

World War II
Activated in late 1943 as a Douglas C-47 Skytrain troop carrier squadron, trained under I Troop Carrier Command in the United States. Was not deployed until the spring of 1945 to England, being assigned to the IX Troop Carrier Command. Was not used in combat operations, however did transport supplies and equipment to the front-line ground forces primarily into Germany and evacuated casualties to rear areas. Returned to the United States in September 1945 and was a transport squadron for Continental Air Forces until its inactivation in September 1946.

Air Force reserve and Korean Mobilization

Reserve fighter-bomber operations

Return to airlift mission
Redesignated as the 313th Troop Carrier Squadron 1 September 1957, the unit transferred to Portland International Airport, Oregon. The squadron flew the Curtiss C-46 Commando and the Fairchild C-119 Flying Boxcar, and in September 1958 flew the first reserve mission outside the continental United States taking a R-33 engine to Elmendorf Air Force Base, Alaska. The squadron was ordered to active service for a month in 1962 during the Cuban Missile Crisis. It became part of the 939th Troop Carrier Group in 1963 and was redesignated the 313th Tactical Airlift Squadron 1 July 1967.

25 July 1968, the squadron transferred to McChord Air Force Base, Washington, where it was redesignated as the 313th Military Airlift Squadron as part of the 939th Military Airlift Group. At McChord, it flew the Lockheed C-141A Starlifter and with a global strategic mission, 313th aircrews saw much service providing airlift to Southeast Asia.

Lineage
 Constituted as the 313th Troop Carrier Squadron on 23 October 1943
 Activated on 1 November 1943
 Inactivated on 7 September 1946
 Redesignated 313th Troop Carrier Squadron, Medium on 10 May 1949
 Activated in the reserve on 27 June 1949
 Ordered to active duty on 1 April 1951
 Inactivated on 2 April 1951
 Redesignated 313th Fighter-Bomber Squadron on 26 May 1952
 Activated in the reserve on 13 June 1952
 Redesignated 313th Troop Carrier Squadron, Medium on 1 September 1957
 Ordered to active duty on 28 October 1962
 Relieved from active duty on 28 November 1962
 Redesignated 313th Tactical Airlift Squadron on 1 July 1967
 Redesignated 313th Military Airlift Squadron (Associate) on 25 July 1968
 Redesignated 313th Airlift Squadron (Associate) on 1 February 1992
 Redesignated 313th Airlift Squadron on 1 October 1994

Assignments 
 349th Troop Carrier Group, 1 November 1943 – 7 September 1946
 349th Troop Carrier Group, 27 June 1949 – 2 April 1951
 349th Fighter-Bomber (later 349 Troop Carrier Group), 13 June 1952
 349th Troop Carrier Wing, 14 April 1959
 939th Troop Carrier Group (later 939 Tactical Airlift Group, 939 Military Airlift Group), 11 February 1963
 446th Military Airlift Wing (later 446 Airlift Wing), 1 July 1973
 446th Operations Group, 1 August 1992 – present

Stations 

 Sedalia Army Air Field, Missouri, 1 November 1943
 Alliance Army Air Field, Nebraska, 20 January 1944
 Pope Field, North Carolina, 11 March 1944
 Baer Field, Indiana, 7–15 March 1945
 RAF Barkston Heath (AAF-483), England, 30 March 1945
 Roye-Amy Airfield (A-73), France, 18 April–13 July 1945

 Bergstrom Field, Texas, 17 September 1945 – 7 September 1946
 Hamilton Air Force Base, California, 27 June 1949 – 2 April 1951
 Hamilton Air Force Base, California, 13 June 1952
 Hill Air Force Base, Utah, 14 October 1955
 Portland International Airport, Oregon, 16 November 1957
 McChord Air Force Base, Washington, 25 July 1968 – present

Aircraft 

 Douglas C-53 Skytrooper, 1943–1944
 Douglas C-47 Skytrain, 1944, 1945–1946
 Curtiss C-46 Commando, 1944–1946; 1949–1951, 1957–1958
 North American F-51 Mustang, 1952–1954
 Lockheed T-33 T-Bird, 1953–1956

 Lockheed F-80 Shooting Star, 1954–1956
 Republic F-84 Thunderjet, 1956–1957
 Fairchild C-119 Flying Boxcar, 1958–1968
 Lockheed C-141 Starlifter, 1968–1996
 Boeing C-17 Globemaster III, 1996–present

Decorations 
 Decorations. Air Force Outstanding Unit Award with Combat "V" Device: 1 August 2002 – 31 July 2002. Air Force Outstanding Unit Awards: 23 December 1964 – 22 January 1965; 26 January 1968 – 1 June 1969; 1 July 1974 – 30 June 1975; 1 July 1975 – 30 June 1977; 1 July 1992 – 30 June 1994; 1 July 1994 – 15 August 1995; 1 July 1996 – 30 June 1998; 1 August 2000 – 31 July 2002; 16 August 2003 – 17 August 2004; 18 August 2004 – 17 August 2005; 18 August 2005 – 17 August 2006; 18 August 2006 – 17 August 2007; 18 August 2007 – 17 August 2008; 18 August 2008 – 17 August 2009. Republic of Vietnam Gallantry Cross with Palm: 1 April 1966 – 28 January 1973.

References

Bibliography

External links

313